FCSD may refer to:
 Forrest City School District
 A fellow of the Chartered Society of Designers

FCSD